Argyraspodes is a butterfly genus in the family Lycaenidae. It is monotypic containing only the species Argyraspodes argyraspis, the warrior silver-spotted copper, which is found in South Africa, in the Western and Eastern Cape, Free State and Northern Cape.

The wingspan is 32–38 mm for males and 35–45 mm females. Adults are on wing from August to March and sometimes from July to April.

References

Aphnaeinae
Monotypic butterfly genera
Lycaenidae genera